DNA-directed RNA polymerase II subunit RPB9 is an enzyme that in humans is encoded by the POLR2I gene.

This gene encodes a subunit of RNA polymerase II, the polymerase responsible for synthesizing messenger RNA in eukaryotes. This subunit, in combination with two other polymerase subunits, forms the DNA binding domain of the polymerase, a groove in which the DNA template is transcribed into RNA. The product of this gene has two zinc finger motifs with conserved cysteines and the subunit does possess zinc binding activity.

References

Further reading